The Graduates is a 1986 Romanian coming of age film directed by Nicolae Corjos.

Cast 
 Ștefan Bănică Jr. - Mihai
 Mihai Constantin - Ionică
  - Dana
 Cesonia Postelnicu - Geta
 Tudor Petrut - Şerban
 Tamara Buciuceanu - Isoscel
 Ion Caramitru - Socrate
 Silviu Stănculescu - Şerban's Father
  - Şerban's Mother
 Sebastian Papaiani - Mihai's Father

References

External links 

1986 comedy films
1986 films
Romanian comedy films
1980s Romanian-language films